David George Lyon (18 January 1951 – 29 April 1999) was an English professional footballer who played in the Football League as a defender for Bury, Huddersfield Town, Mansfield Town, Cambridge United and Northampton Town during the 1960s and 1970s.

References

1951 births
1999 deaths
People from Great Bowden
Footballers from Leicestershire
English footballers
Association football defenders
Bury F.C. players
Huddersfield Town A.F.C. players
Mansfield Town F.C. players
Cambridge United F.C. players
Northampton Town F.C. players
Cambridge City F.C. players
English Football League players